Millepora tenera is a species of fire coral in the family Milleporidae. It is native to the Red Sea and the western Indo-Pacific region and is a zooxanthellate species with a calcareous skeleton. It was first described in 1949 by the Dutch zoologist Hilbrand Boschma.

Distribution and habitat
Millepora tenera is native to the western Indo-Pacific. Its range extends from the Red Sea and the eastern coast of Africa to Japan, Australia, American Samoa and the Mariana Islands.

Toxicity
Like other fire corals, Millepora tenera can cause painful rashes when touched by bare skin. Extracts of this coral contain neurotoxins, and can cause convulsions, respiratory failure and death in mice. The extract causes hemolysis, contains a dermonecrotic factor and has antigenic properties. Rabbits immunised with the extract developed neutralising antibodies that were protective against hemolysis, dermonecrosis and death. The antiserum could also be used to protect against the toxins present in an extract of Millepora alcicornis.

Status
Millepora tenera has a wide range and is common over much of that range. It is subject to coral diseases and coral bleaching under adverse environmental conditions, and like other corals, is threatened by degradation of its coral reef habitat. However it is a fast-growing, rather weed-like species, and is one of the first species to recolonise damaged reefs. For these reasons, the International Union for Conservation of Nature has assessed its conservation status as being of "least concern".

References

Milleporidae
Animals described in 1949